The Kensington Oval is located on 344 The Parade, Kensington, South Australia.  Now used primarily for cricket in South Australia, the venue was once Adelaide's premier athletics facility and known as Olympic Sports Field.

Early history
From an area originally known as Shipsters Paddock, Kensington Oval was officially opened on Saturday, 10 July 1875.

The ground was originally used for a range of sports including Australian Rules Football. The Kensington Football Club and the Norwood Football Club played at the oval between 1875 and 1897.

The Norwood Cycle and Motor Club, now Norwood Cycling Club, the oldest cycling club in the southern hemisphere, had its opening day celebrations at the oval on 4 February 1884.

Despite being located in Adelaide's eastern suburbs, the oval was also the home ground for the West Adelaide Football Club in 1897.

As the home ground of the Kensington Districts Cricket Club, Sir Donald Bradman played there often after joining the Kensington club upon his move to Adelaide from Sydney in 1935.

Olympic Sports Field
From 1963, the ground was converted into an athletics stadium, featuring a rubber-bitumen track. In 1975, the track was upgraded to tartan track.

As Olympic Sports Field, the ground was home to Athletics South Australia's interclub athletics competition from October to March and the South Australian Championships.  A number of Australian Championships; in 1967, 1968, 1970, 1974, 1975, 1981, 1986 and 1992, were also held at the venue.

The ground was also home to the Adelaide City soccer club and, in 1977, a game against Sydney Marconi saw a record crowd of 13,132.

Redevelopment as Kensington Oval
In the 1990s, a new home for South Australian athletics, Santos Stadium, was built and the oval was returned to a sports playing field, which is held in trust by the City of Burnside and is currently leased for specific hours of (school term) use by the nearby Pembroke School. The running track was removed in 1997 and the ground was redeveloped as a cricket ground. Its original name of Kensington Oval was revived and the ground now plays host to grade and women's cricket matches.

References

Athletics (track and field) venues in Australia
1875 establishments in Australia
Sports venues in Adelaide
Sports venues completed in 1875
Cricket grounds in Australia